Brereton may refer to:

People
 Brereton (surname)

Places
 Brereton, Barbados
 Brereton, Cheshire, England
 Brereton Hall, Cheshire
 Brereton, Illinois, USA
 Brereton, Staffordshire, England

Other uses
 Baron Brereton, a title in the Peerage of Ireland
 Brereton House, official residence of the Principal of Karachi Grammar School, named after The Rev. Henry Brereton
 Brereton Social F.C., a football club based in Brereton in Rugeley, Staffordshire, England